McCamey Independent School District is a public school district based in McCamey in Upton County, Texas (USA).

In 2009, the school district was rated "academically acceptable" by the Texas Education Agency.

Schools
McCamey High School (Grades 9-12)
McCamey Middle School (Grades 5-8)
McCamey Primary School (Grades PK-4)

References

External links
McCamey ISD

School districts in Upton County, Texas